George Savarese (born August 14, 1965) is an educator and radio personality.

Education
Savarese studied at the private catholic Duquesne University in Pittsburgh. There, he earned his Bachelor's degree in English, history, and political science in 1988, a Master's degree in history in 1991, and a Master's degree in education in 1996. Savarese also studied at Cambridge University.

Media career
George Savarese has worked as a radio journalist for over 25 years.  He served as the host of the "Global Press Conference," on KQV radio for 10 years and also worked as News Director of WDUQ in Pittsburgh..  Savarese has also worked as a correspondent for AP Radio and National Public Radio.  He currently covers Pittsburgh sports as a correspondent for CBS-Radio and the NFL Radio Network on Sirius XM Radio. In his career, he has interviewed Mario Lemieux, Wayne Gretzky, Ron Francis, Tony Gwynn, Cal Ripken, Albert Pujols, Derek Jeter, Steve Young, Jerry Rice, Troy Polamalu, Heath Miller, and Sidney Crosby.

Educational career
Since 1997, George Savarese has been a teacher at Mt. Lebanon High School in Pittsburgh, Pennsylvania.  Prior to joining Mt. Lebanon, Savarese taught at the Pennsylvania Governor's School for International Studies and was Education Director of the World Affairs Council of Pittsburgh.  As of 2022, Savarese is widely recognized as one of the greatest teachers in the history of Mt. Lebanon School District.

As the school's former Forensics Coach, Savarese guided his students to ten consecutive Pittsburgh District titles and the 2006 State Championship.  In his tenure as Director of Speech & Debate, he also coached thirteen Mt. Lebanon students to individual state championships, including four Extemporaneous champions.
Five of his students were National Finalists at NFL Nationals, all finishing as runners-up in their National Championship events.   
Savarese is also one of the coaches of Mt. Lebanon's Model United Nations (MUN) team, along with his colleague, history teacher Adam Lumish; their MUN team has consistently been among the premier programs in the country.

For his work at the high school, he has been named a Teacher of Excellence by the Teacher Excellence Center, and was inducted into the Cum Laude society.

In 2018, Savarese was one of six Pittsburgh Teachers of Excellence (out of 3000 nominees), who were each awarded a $2500 educational grant by the Teacher Excellence Center in the state of Pennsylvania.

He was also chosen as one of ten Pennsylvania teachers to travel to EU and NATO headquarters in Brussels as part of a European Union program.

Personal life
Savarese is married and has two children, Sophia and Giorgio, with his wife Tyra. 
The couple resides in Mt. Lebanon, Pennsylvania. Savarese speaks fluent Italian.

References

American radio personalities
Duquesne University alumni
People from Mt. Lebanon, Pennsylvania
Living people
Year of birth uncertain
Schoolteachers from Pennsylvania
1965 births